Pfeiffer-Redwood Creek is a stream in Big Sur, California, about 26 miles from Carmel. It is a tributary to the Big Sur River. The creek feeds the 40-foot (12.2m) Pfeiffer Falls, inside of Julia Pfeiffer Burns State Park. It is named for John Pfeiffer, a homesteader who had  of land in the Big Sur River area.

Notes

Rivers of Monterey County, California
Rivers of Northern California
Big Sur